Melaleuca wimmerensis, commonly known as the Wimmera bottlebrush, is a plant in the myrtle family, Myrtaceae and is endemic to the state of Victoria in Australia. (Some Australian state herbaria continue to use the name Callistemon wimmerensis). It is a recently (2008) discovered shrub, often with many stems arising from a lignotuber and is similar to Melaleuca paludicola but has pink or mauve flowers tipped with yellow anthers over a short period between October and early December.

Description
There is a mid-vein but the lateral veins are indistinct. Oil glands are visible on the lower surface of the leaves.

The filaments of the stamens are pink, tipped with a yellow anther.

Taxonomy and naming
Callistemon wimmerensis was first formally described in 2008 by Neil Marriott and Geoffrey Carr in Muelleria, based on a population occurring on crown land on the west bank of the Mackenzie River near Horsham. In 2011 another population was reported to have been discovered in a swamp in the southern Grampians. Lyndley Craven transferred the species to Melaleuca in 2009, giving the description in Novon. The specific epithet (wimmerensis) refers to the locality where the species is found.

Callistemon wimmerensis is regarded as a synonym of Melaleuca wimmerensis by the Royal Botanic Gardens, Kew.

Distribution and habitat
This melaleuca occurs in the Wimmera district in Victoria growing in woodland near rivers and streams.

Conservation
Melaleuca wimmerensis (as Callistemon wimmerensis) has been classified as "critically endangered" under the Australian Government Environment Protection and Biodiversity Conservation Act 1999.

References

wimmerensis
Flora of Victoria (Australia)
Critically endangered flora of Australia
Myrtales of Australia
Plants described in 2009